Captain Jintu Gogoi (21 November 1970 – 30 June 1999), VrC was an Indian Army officer of 17 Garhwal Rifles. He was posthumously awarded the Vir Chakra, India's third highest wartime military decoration, for his courage and bravery in combat during operations in the Kargil War in 1999.

Early life and military career
Captain Jintu Gogoi is the son of Duluprabha Gogoi and Flying officer Thogiram Gogoi, an Indian Air Force Veteran.
Jintu Gogoi's father Thogiram Gogoi stated that his son Jintu always wanted to join the Indian Army.

After graduation from Gandhi Memorial National College, Jintu Gogoi joined Officers Training Academy, Chennai on May 9, 1994, and was commissioned into the 17th Battalion of the Garhwal Rifles on March 11, 1995.

Before joining Kargil war, Gogoi took Mhow, YO, Winter Warfare, and Commando trainings.

Kargil War and death
Just after his marriage engagement, Gogoi had to rush to Kargil as the war declared.

On 29 June, Jintu Gogoi was assigned to evict the enemy from the Kalapathar area. All the companies, except the platoon led by Gogoi, exposed to enemy during the daytime, thus Gogoi decided to move at night. Though Gogoi's platoon, under command, evicted the enemy, Gogoi had to pay for the victory with his supreme sacrifice. There was an emotional funeral of Captain Gogoi, as the major insurgent outfit ULFA called Army officers and personnel in the Indian Army to avoid the Kargil War.

Vir Chakra 
As described in Gogoi's Vir Chakra award citation:

Garhhwal Rifle on Jintu Gogoi
The Wiki page of Garhwal Rifles (See Kargil War Section) cited a note with disappointment about supreme sacrifice of Capt Jintu Gogoi with and others of Garhwal Rifles for their Heroism in Kargil War, with the citation:

Honours
 Assam government posthumously awarded the state’s highest bravery award Bir Chilarai Award in 2008.
 In honour of Martyr Jintu Gogoi, JOYA GOGOI COLLEGE of Golaghat, from where Gogoi studied his pre-university, named the library as a mark of respect to the Kargil Martyr Capt. Jintu Gogoi.
The Indian Army organizes Captain Jintu Gogoi, VrC Memorial Football Tournament every year.
Jintu Gogoi is the first Assamese in Indian Army who sacrificed supreme in Kargil War.
2020 Tokyo Olympics Indian boxer Lovlina Borgohain uses to pay her salute before she attempts any International game.

See also
Kargil War
Vikram Batra
Manoj Kumar Pandey

References

Indian Army officers
Recipients of the Vir Chakra
Indian military personnel killed in action
People of the Kargil War
1970 births
1999 deaths
People from Golaghat
People from Assam by occupation
Military personnel from Assam